Chevrier's field mouse (Apodemus chevrieri)  is a species of rodent in the family Muridae.
It is found only in China.

References

Apodemus
Endemic fauna of China
Rodents of China
Mammals described in 1868
Taxonomy articles created by Polbot